Jon Levy may refer to:

Jon Levy (photographer), founder and director of British photography company Foto8
Jon D. Levy (born 1954), American judge in Maine
Jon Levy (behaviorist), behavior expert and social engineer

See also
John Levy (disambiguation)